Andrew J. Bryan (1848–1921) was an architect in the Southern United States, known for his work on county courthouses.

Based in Jackson, Mississippi, he designed the Old Monroe County Courthouse in Monroeville, Alabama, and the Pointe Coupee Parish Courthouse in New Roads, Louisiana.

References

Further reading
Delos D. Hughes Andrew J. Bryan: A New South Architect Legacy: The Magazine of the Monroe County Heritage Museum Spring/Summer 2002: 9–13 
The Man Who Designed Courthouses  January 29, 2012 Every Now and Then; Bringing Douglas County history to a 21st-century audience
The Lewmans of Louisville: Contractors of the Old Courthouse Legacy: The Magazine of the Monroe County Heritage Museum (Spring/Summer 2002): 5–8 
Harriet Swift,  "1903 Courthouse Embodies Public Spirit of Judge Nicholas J. Stallworth" Legacy: The Magazine of the Monroe County Heritage Museum Spring/Summer 2002: 1–4.
Purported gravesite in Chico

1848 births
1921 deaths
19th-century American architects
Place of birth missing
20th-century American architects